Dragonlance: Fifth Age is an accessory for the SAGA System, published in 1996. It uses the setting of Dragonlance, which originally was used in the Advanced Dungeons & Dragons fantasy role-playing game.

Contents
Dragonlance: Fifth Age is a diceless role-playing game, where players use cards instead of dice for character creation, determining success of actions, and resolving combat. Each player holds a hand of cards with values on them from 1 at the lowest to 10 at the highest. The size of a player's hand is determined by how many quests or scenarios that player's character has completed. Whenever a skill test is to be made or a combat change resolved, the player plays a card and adds the value of the card to an attribute number; if the total is higher than the value determined by the referee, the character succeeds. The dramatic roles of Dragonlance characters is stressed throughout the manual, and assumes that mundane actions such as purchasing standard gear are not necessary to role-play. The game features an open spell system rather than a set spell list, where a player describes what his hero is attempting using the magical abilities open to him, and the referee decides to what extent the hero is successful.

Dragonlance: Fifth Age was published in a boxed set, which contained three books, a deck of cards, a map of Krynn, a two-panel quick reference card, and eighteen character cards. The books were The Book of the Fifth Age, Dusk or Dawn, and Heroes of the New Age. The Fate deck was made up of eighty two cards in nine suits, with eight suits consisting of nine cards and the last one having ten.

Setting
This set takes place 30 years after the second Cataclysm of Krynn, with the old gods of Krynn having left after the destruction brought by Chaos. The game is based in the new Krynn era, that of the Fifth Age, also known as the Age of Mortals. Dragon Overlords now rule much of Ansalon, and have slaughtered the other dragons for their lifeforce. Although the Dragon Lords remain, Man is now the dominant force in Ansalon. The world's old magic is gone, and creatures such as the good dragons, silvanesti elves, and kender live in fear. It is a time of chaos, with rival factions vying for power and the Dragons desperately attempting to reassert their authority.

Adventure
The 48-page "Heroes of a New Age" booklet is dedicated to a sample scenario, aimed at new heroes, and concerns the retrieval of a valuable stolen gem. The party is attacked by a green dragon, and must negotiate their way through the caverns of a dwarven nation.

Development
Dragonlance: Fifth Age was developed because TSR was looking to sell a non-Dungeons & Dragons type game.

Sue Weinlein Cook liked the idea of a more story based game.

Publication history
Dragonlance: Fifth Age was published as a boxed set and released in 1996. Dragonlance: Fifth Age was written by William W. Connors and Sue Weinlein Cook. The set included three booklets (128 pages, 96 pages, and 48 pages respectively), a deck of 82 Fate Cards, 18 character sheets depicting famous characters from the novels, and a map of Ansalon - the part of Krynn in which the game is set.

Dragonlance: Fifth Age was in planning before Dragons of Summer Flame was out.

Heroes of Steel is the first boxed expansion for the Dragonlance: Fifth Age campaign world.

Reception
Paul Pettengale reviewed Dragonlance: Fifth Age for Arcane magazine, rating it an 8 out of 10 overall. He commented that "Dragonlance comes of age with the release of a game dedicated entirely to this heroic gameworld. And it's nothing like AD&D." He compares the Saga Rules System to AD&D: "Where AD&D is complex, verbose, highly detailed and rule-bound, the diceless Dragonlance system is flexible, quick and stresses the importance of playing heroic roles in the world of Kyrnn rather than replicating a quasi-reality and trouncing anything which is uglier than you are." He felt that using cards instead of dice "cuts out the randomness of dice throws, enabling the player to keep the high-point cards in his hand ready for when he really needs them." He explained that the changes in the setting make for "a turbulent, often bitter campaign world, but one in which the strong prevail" and noted that it is the players "who have enjoyed the novels who are most likely to revel in this game". He surmised that, despite the openness of things such as the spell system imply that an experienced referee is recommended to run this game, it is "a system that can be easily adapted by anyone - it gives you the freedom to get out of it exactly what you want, rather than pinning you down to a certain style of play". He concluded by saying: "Fifth Age is an able system, which stresses dynamic play, cuts out the randomness of dice throws, and which is set in a colourful campaign setting (with bags of novel-based background to draw on). It won't be to everyone's tastes, but I for one thought it was fun, fast and replicated the feel of what Dragonlance is all about."

In a review of Dragonlance: Fifth Age for Pyramid #23 (January/February 1997), the reviewer was originally skeptical of the game: "When Harold Johnson first told me about the new Dragonlance line early in 1996, I had my doubts. I was told that the Fifth Age line was to be a completely new card-based roleplaying system [...] Now that I have both read and played Dragonlance: Fifth Age, I can say that my initial reaction was dead wrong. Simply put, it's a darn fine game."

Dragonlance: Fifth Age was met with mixed feeling as it made many changes to the world of Krynn.  Many of the complaints concerned dislike over the setting changes.  Of Fifth Age's fans, some liked it for the same reason: that it moved the setting forward.

Financially, Fifth Age was a failure.  TSR in the mid-90s had developed a reputation for not budgeting well and releasing a blizzard of products onto the market with little support or advertising.  Whether TSR would have continued the project is unknown; as a more narrative-focused game, expansion material would inherently more involve the setting rather than the system.  When the Wizards of the Coast acquisition of TSR closed in 1997, the first thing that Wizards did was take inventory of TSR's products, and stopped production of the money-losing ones.  This included Fifth Age.

Reviews
Dragon #237
Shadis #27

References

Dragonlance supplements
Role-playing game supplements introduced in 1996